Tuberta is a genus of araneomorph spiders in the family Cybaeidae, and was first described by Eugène Simon in 1884.  it contains only two species: T. maerens and T. mirabilis. Originally placed with the funnel weavers, it was moved to the Hahniidae in 1967, then to the Cybaeidae in 2017.

References

Araneomorphae genera
Cybaeidae
Spiders of Asia
Taxa named by Eugène Simon